Maynard is a city in Fayette County, Iowa, United States. The population was 476 at the time of the 2020 census.

Geography
Maynard is located at  (42.774493, -91.878293) on the Little Volga River.

Demographics

2010 census
As of the census of 2010, there were 518 people, 228 households, and 141 families living in the city. The racial makeup of the city was 98.6% White, 0.2% African American, 0.8% from other races, and 0.4% from two or more races. Hispanic or Latino of any race were 2.5% of the population.

There were 228 households, of which 29.8% had children under the age of 18 living with them, 48.2% were married couples living together, 8.3% had a female householder with no husband present, 5.3% had a male householder with no wife present, and 38.2% were non-families. 31.6% of all households were made up of individuals, and 13.2% had someone living alone who was 65 years of age or older. The average household size was 2.27 and the average family size was 2.82.

The median age in the city was 42.8 years. 24.1% of residents were under the age of 18; 7.3% were between the ages of 18 and 24; 22.1% were from 25 to 44; 29.1% were from 45 to 64; and 17.2% were 65 years of age or older. The gender makeup of the city was 50.6% male and 49.4% female.

2000 census
As of the census of 2000, there were 500 people, 222 households, and 138 families living in the city. The racial makeup of the city was 100.00% White. Hispanic or Latino of any race were 0.20% of the population.

There were 222 households, out of which 29.7% had children under the age of 18 living with them, 51.4% were married couples living together, 7.7% had a female householder with no husband present, and 37.4% were non-families. 34.7% of all households were made up of individuals, and 21.6% had someone living alone who was 65 years of age or older. The average household size was 2.25 and the average family size was 2.92.

In the city, the population was spread out, with 24.0% under the age of 18, 6.6% from 18 to 24, 26.8% from 25 to 44, 20.6% from 45 to 64, and 22.0% who were 65 years of age or older. The median age was 41 years. For every 100 females, there were 106.6 males. For every 100 females age 18 and over, there were 99.0 males.

The median income for a household in the city was $32,639, and the median income for a family was $40,833. Males had a median income of $28,929 versus $26,667 for females. The per capita income for the city was $15,779. About 4.4% of families and 8.1% of the population were below the poverty line, including 8.5% of those under age 18 and 9.8% of those age 65 or over.

Education
Maynard is home to the West Central Community School District, which operates local public schools and competes in the Upper Iowa Conference for athletics.

References

Cities in Iowa
Cities in Fayette County, Iowa